Crickhowell Bridge is an 18th-century bridge that spans the River Usk in Crickhowell, Powys, Wales. The main A4077 road to Gilwern crosses it.

History and description
The bridge is first documented in 1538 and is believed to have existed since medieval times, originally constructed from timber. In 1706 it was completely rebuilt in stone with additional arches, at a cost of £400. It was replaced by a temporary  bridge in 1808 after being severely damaged by flooding and the repaired bridge, in 1810, was widened on the northwest (upstream) side (the downstream side remains original to 1706). The bridge engineer was Benjamin James (of Llangattock) and the cost totalled £2,300. In 1828–30 the northeast end was altered, reducing the upstream length by one arch by combining the two largest upstream arches into one. The bridge was substantially repaired in 1928 and again in 1979, to repair cracking caused by motor vehicles. In 2011 part of the parapet was demolished by a car, following a police chase.

Crickhowell Bridge is unusual (due to the 1828 alterations) in that it has a different number of arches upstream (12) from downstream (13). On the (original) downstream side, the arches are recessed, though not on the upstream side. The bridge has V-shaped cutwaters to both sides with pedestrian refuges above. Construction is of rubble masonry with flat coping stones on the parapets.

The bridge became a Grade I listed structure in 1998, being "one of Wales' finest early bridges". It is also a scheduled monument.

See also
 Grade I listed buildings in Powys

References

Bridges over the River Usk
Transport infrastructure completed in 1706
Grade I listed bridges in Wales
Grade I listed buildings in Powys
Road bridges in Wales
Bridges completed in 1706
Stone bridges in the United Kingdom
Bridges in Powys
Crickhowell